Brock Aynsley is a Canadian former professional football player. He was a Canadian all-star and Grey Cup champion wide receiver who played eight seasons in the Canadian Football League, winning a Grey Cup Championship.

Graduating from Washington State University, Aynsley signed with his home province's BC Lions, playing 31 games for them over 3 years and catching 50 passes for 784 yards and one touchdown. Moving to the Montreal Alouettes for nearly 3 seasons, he would play 41 games with 79 receptions for 1588 yards and 9 touchdowns. His best year was 1977 when he was an all-star and won the Grey Cup with the Larks. He then played parts of 3 seasons with the Hamilton Tiger-Cats; 19 games with 30 catches for 492 yards and 4 touchdowns. He finished his career with 9 games with the Winnipeg Blue Bombers, snagging 5 passes for 74 yards.

His career totals are 100 games, 164 receptions, 2938 yards, a 17.9 yard per reception average, a 105 yard touchdown pass, and 14 touchdowns.

External links
CFLapedia bio
Fanbase bio
College stats

1950 births
Sportspeople from Kelowna
Washington State Cougars football players
Canadian male sprinters
Living people
Montreal Alouettes players
BC Lions players
Hamilton Tiger-Cats players
Winnipeg Blue Bombers players
Players of Canadian football from British Columbia
Athletes (track and field) at the 1971 Pan American Games
Pan American Games track and field athletes for Canada